Louis Bonniot de Fleurac (Louis Victor Marie Bonniot de Fleurac; 19 November 1876 in Paris – 20 March 1965) was a French athlete.  He competed in the 1906 Summer Olympics in Athens and in the 1908 Summer Olympics in London. In the 1500 metres, de Fleurac placed sixth in his initial semifinal heat and did not advance to the final.

His work was also part of the painting event in the art competition at the 1928 Summer Olympics.

References

Sources
 
 
 

1876 births
1965 deaths
Athletes from Paris
Olympic athletes of France
Athletes (track and field) at the 1906 Intercalated Games
Athletes (track and field) at the 1908 Summer Olympics
Olympic bronze medalists for France
French male middle-distance runners
French male long-distance runners
World record setters in athletics (track and field)
Medalists at the 1908 Summer Olympics
Olympic bronze medalists in athletics (track and field)
Olympic competitors in art competitions
19th-century French people
20th-century French people